Panko Brashnarov (Macedonian and , Panko Brašnar; 27 July 1883 – 13 July 1951) was a revolutionary and member of the left wing of the Internal Macedonian-Adrianople Revolutionary Organization (IMARO) and IMRO (United) later. As with many other IMARO members of the time, historians from North Macedonia consider him an ethnic Macedonian, whereas historians in Bulgaria consider him a Bulgarian. However such Macedonian Bulgarian activists, who came from the IMARO and the IMRO (United) never managed to get rid of their strong pro-Bulgarian bias, and continued to see themselves as Bulgarians, even in Communist Yugoslavia.

Biography 
He was born in Veles (then known by the name Köprülü) in the Kosovo vilayet of the Ottoman Empire (present-day North Macedonia) where he graduated from Bulgarian Exarchate's school. Brashnarov graduated from the Bulgarian pedagogical school in Skopje. In 1903 he took part in the Ilinden Uprising. In 1908 he joined the People's Federative Party (Bulgarian Section). In 1903-1913 Brashnarov worked as a Bulgarian teacher. In 1914-1915 he completed a two-year higher educational course in Plovdiv. He was mobilized in the Bulgarian army during the First World War and participated in the battles of Doiran. After Bulgaria lost the war, the Bulgarian occupation of Vardar Macedonia ended and Brashnarov remained in the new Kingdom of Yugoslavia. In 1919, he joined the Yugoslav Communist Party. In 1925 in Vienna, Brashnarov was elected as one of the leaders of Internal Macedonian Revolutionary Organization (United). Because of his political convictions, he was sentenced to seven years in prison in the Kingdom of Yugoslavia. In a report from 2 July 1929, the Vienna newspaper Arbeiter Zeitung stated that the 50-year-old Macedonian Bulgarian Panko Brashnarov, was imprisoned in Maribor. After his release in 1936 he remained politically passive.

When Bulgaria occupied and later annexed Vardar Banovina in 1941, he was one of the founders of the Bulgarian Action Committees. Until 1943 Brashnarov worked again as a Bulgarian teacher. Till then there was no real communist resistance in Vardar Macedonia, but in the middle of 1943 it became obvious that Germany and Bulgaria would be defeated. In the same year Brashnarov became politically active again and joined the Yugoslav Communist partizan's movement there fighting against the Axis Powers. At that time the Yugoslav communists recognized a separate Macedonian nationality to stop the fears of the local population that they would continue the former Yugoslav policy of forced serbianization, but they didn't support the view that the Macedonian Slavs are Bulgarians, because that meant in practice, the area should remain part of the Bulgaria after the war. On 2 August 1944, the Antifascist Assembly of the National Liberation of Macedonia took place at the St. Prohor Pčinjski monastery. Brashnarov served as the first speaker. The modern Macedonian state was officially proclaimed as a federal state within Josip Broz Tito's Yugoslavia, receiving recognition from the Allies in 1945.

The new Macedonian authorities had a primary goal to de-Bulgarize the Macedonian Slavs and to create a separate Macedonian consciousness that would inspire identification with Yugoslavia. From the start of the new Yugoslavia, these authorities organised frequent purges and trials of Macedonian communists and non-party people were charged with autonomist deviation. Many of the former left-wing IMRO government officials were purged from their positions, then isolated, arrested, imprisoned or executed on various (in many cases fabricated) charges including pro-Bulgarian leanings, demands for greater or complete independence of Yugoslav Macedonia, collaboration with the Cominform after the Tito-Stalin split in 1948, forming of conspirative political groups or organisations, demands for greater democracy and the like.

Initially, he cooperated with the new regime, but soon after had realized the defeats brought about by the Yugoslav Macedonism, Brashnarov returned to the IMARO's ideas for pro-Bulgarian Independent Macedonia. In 1948, being fully disappointed by the policy of the authorities, Brashnarov complained of it in letters to Joseph Stalin and to Georgi Dimitrov and asked for help, maintaining better relations with Bulgaria and the Soviet Union, and opposing the serbianization and de-Bulgarization of the Macedonian people. He did so together with Pavel Shatev. As a result, he was arrested in 1950 as a Cominform agent under the accusation of "organizing an illegal group to support the Soviet Union in its the conflict with Yugoslavia". Afterwards he was imprisoned in Goli Otok labor camp where he died the following year. Initially, Brashnarov was buried in the labor camp, but two years later his remains were transferred somewhere. His grave was found in 2011 in Zagreb, where he was reburied in a mass grave of prisoners from Goli Otok.

The name of Brashnarov was taboo in the SR Macedonia during the period 1950–1990, because of the obligatory pro-Serbian and anti-Bulgarian tendency among the "socialist" Yugoslav Macedonian historians, but he was rehabilitated in North Macedonia during the 1990s after the country gained its independence. Although he was liked by the historiography in Communist Bulgaria as a left-wing pro-Bulgarian politician, after the fall of communism he has been criticized by some right-wing nationalist historians there as a late repented Macedonian Communist apostate.

References

Sources
 Historical Dictionary of the Republic of Macedonia, Dimitar Bechev Scarecrow Press, 2009, Panko Brashnarov, p. 30., 
 Веселин Ангелов,"Македонският въпрос в българо-югославските отношения (1944–1952)", УИ "Св. Климент Охридски", София 2005, стр. 437-444  
 Speech on United Macedonia and the army of the Macedonians "the struggle of the Ilinden combatants with that one of the young Macedonian Army... for an ideal achievement - liberated and united Macedonia"

External links
 Панко Брашнаров и Павел Шатев за обстановката във Вардарска Македония през 1944-1948 г. — изложение до ВКП(б)

1883 births
1951 deaths
People from Veles, North Macedonia
People from Kosovo vilayet
Bulgarian revolutionaries
Bulgarian military personnel of World War I
Yugoslav politicians
Yugoslav communists
Macedonian politicians
Bulgarian people imprisoned abroad
Bulgarian people who died in prison custody
Yugoslav people who died in prison custody
Prisoners who died in Yugoslav detention
Members of the Internal Macedonian Revolutionary Organization
Internal Macedonian Revolutionary Organization (United) members
Bulgarian educators